Wang Dong (born 6 January 1995) is a Chinese footballer currently playing as a defender for Zhuhai Qin'ao in China League Two.

Career statistics

Club

Notes

References

1995 births
Living people
Sportspeople from Xuzhou
Footballers from Jiangsu
Chinese footballers
Chinese expatriate footballers
Association football midfielders
Jiangsu F.C. players
Changchun Yatai F.C. players
GS Loures players
Clube Oriental de Lisboa players
G.D. Tourizense players
A.R.C. Oleiros players
C.D. Cova da Piedade players
Chinese expatriate sportspeople in Portugal
Expatriate footballers in Portugal